Sanar may refer to:

 Sanar-e Olya, a village in Mazandaran Province, Iran
 Sanar-e Sofla, a village in Mazandaran Province, Iran

See also
 Sanare (disambiguation)